These are the matches played by Libya national futsal team, matches will be added as soon as the team play them

Matches

1974

1998

2000

2005

2006

2007

2008

2009

2010 

 Updated after Croatia game (10.11.2010)

Overall Record 

 Updated after Croatia game (10.11.2010)

Notes

matches
Futsal matches by national team
1998 in futsal
2000 in futsal
2005 in futsal
2006 in futsal
2007 in futsal
2008 in futsal
2009 in futsal
2010 in futsal